The Sisterhood of St. John the Divine is a religious community of nuns in the Anglican Church of Canada.

Founded in Toronto in 1884 by Mother Hannah Grier Coome, the order ministers at St. John's Rehab Hospital and is known for its members' distinctive blue habits, retreat leadership, and spiritual direction services. The sisters make altar linens to order, and founded the Altar Guild at St. Thomas Anglican Church. The Sisterhood has been active in liturgical renewal and unequivocal in its acceptance of the Book of Alternative Services.

The order has houses in Toronto (St. John's Convent and Guest House) and Victoria (St. John's House, BC).

External links
Sisterhood of St. John the Divine
The Sisterhood of S. John the Divine, Toronto (1882)

Anglican orders and communities
Anglican Church of Canada
Anglican Church in Ontario
Religious organizations established in 1884
Christian religious orders established in the 19th century